Pseudomonad may refer to:

Biology 
a member of:
 Pseudomonadaceae, the family.
 Pseudomonas, the genus.

Mathematics 
 Pseudomonad (Category Theory), a generalisation of a monad on a category.